Ernst Stettler (17 July 1921 – 28 August 2001) was a Swiss racing cyclist. He rode in the 1949 Tour de France.

References

External links
 

1921 births
2001 deaths
People from Zurzach District
Swiss male cyclists
Sportspeople from Aargau
Tour de Suisse stage winners